The Porsche 928 is a luxury grand tourer produced by Porsche AG of Germany from 1978 until 1995. Originally intended to replace the company's iconic 911, the 928 combined the power, poise, and handling of a sports car with the refinement, comfort, and equipment of a luxury sedan. The 928 became the top-of-the-line production car sold by Porsche. Porsche executives believed such a flagship would have wider appeal than the compact 911.

The 928 has the distinction of being the company's first production V8-powered model and its only coupé powered by a front-mounted V8 engine.

Conception

By the late 1960s, Porsche had firmly established itself as a manufacturer of high-performance sports cars. In the wake of the 1970s oil crisis, executives, including owner Ferdinand Porsche, were beginning to consider adding a more fuel-efficient luxury touring car to the line-up. Managing director Ernst Fuhrmann was pressuring Ferdinand to approve development of the new model due to concerns that the then-current flagship model, the 911, was reaching the limits of its potential. Fuhrmann believed that the future of the company relied upon grand touring cars with conventional engines rather than unconventional sports cars. Slumping sales of the 911 in the mid-1970s seemed to confirm that the model was approaching the end of its economic life cycle. Fuhrmann envisioned the new range-topping grand tourer model as being the best possible combination of a sports coupé and a luxury sedan. This would set it apart from the 911, with its relatively spartan interior and true sports car performance. The targets were that the car had to compete on par with offerings from Mercedes-Benz and BMW while also being successful in the United States, Porsche's main market at the time.

Ordered by Ferdinand Porsche to design a production-feasible concept for the new model, Fuhrmann initiated a design study in 1971, eventually yielding the 928 which was the first clean sheet design by the company for its own model; the 356 was a similar design to the Volkswagen Beetle, the 911 was an evolution of the 356, the 914 was a joint effort intended as a replacement for the Volkswagen Karmann Ghia and 912, and the 924 was the result of abandoned project by Volkswagen and Audi.

Several drivetrain layouts were considered during early development, including rear- and mid-engine, but most were dismissed because of technical and legislative difficulties. Having the engine, transmission, catalytic converter(s) and exhaust all cramped into a small rear engine bay made emission and noise control difficult which were the problems Porsche had with the 911. After deciding that the mid-engine layout did not allow enough room in the passenger compartment, a front-engine, rear-wheel drive layout was chosen.

Ferdinand Piëch proposed the use of a 4.6-litre 90 degree V10 engine with 88 mm bore spacing, a derivative of the Audi 5 cylinder engine (used to power the Lamborghini Gallardo), which in turn is based upon the Volkswagen EA827 unit. The Porsche board objected as this engine would give rise to a rumour of a new 911 with a front-mounted Volkswagen-based engine, but also it is theorized that the board wanted to maintain some distance from the Volkswagen group.

The resulting all-alloy M28 engine has multiple unusual features. Its bore spacing is 122 mm, reflecting the use of thick, all-aluminium cylinder barrels with no steel liners. Water jackets were very large, which indicated that Porsche may have wanted to eventually take this engine racing.  In order to maintain a low hood line, the engine was designed for airflow first, thus the spark plugs are located at the top of the head. The four-bolt bearings are sizeable and are fed oil via grooves in the bottom surface of the block. The bearings themselves are supported by a large one-piece structure that forms a lower block, and the cast aluminum oil pan is bolted onto this part.

The oil and water pumps are driven by a timing belt; DOHC engines introduced in 1985 used a hybrid timing system; the timing belt operated only the exhaust camshafts, and the intake camshafts were operated via an internally-mounted simplex roller chain from the exhaust camshaft. This method reduced the complexity of the timing belt layout, and as a result, required fewer components, such as idler rollers and guides, and led to easier and less costly maintenance of the timing belt. This timing system was later used in the Porsche 944, and was also used by Audi and Volkswagen on their belt-driven DOHC engines.

The first two running prototypes of Porsche's M28 V8 used one four-barrel carburetor for initial testing. Actual production cars employed the planned Bosch K-Jetronic fuel injection system. When increasing concern within the company over price and availability of fuel during the oil crisis of the 1970s became an issue of contention, smaller engines were considered in the interest of fuel economy. A push began for the development of a 3.3 L  powerplant envisioned by Fuhrmann, but company engineers balked at this suggestion.

The finished car debuted at the 1977 Geneva Motor Show before going on sale later that year as a 1978 model. Although it won early acclaim for its comfort, power and futuristic design, sales were slow. Base prices were much higher than that of the previous range-topping 911 model and the 928's front-engined, water-cooled design alienated many Porsche purists.

Fuhrmann's replacement, Peter Schutz, decided that the models should be sold side by side, feeling that the 911 still had potential in the company's line-up. Legislation against rear-engined vehicles did not materialize. Although it never sold in the numbers Fuhrmann envisioned, the 928 developed an avid following and had an 18-year production run.

Design and specifications

The 928 featured a large, front-mounted and water-cooled V8 engine driving the rear wheels. Porsche upgraded the engine from mechanical to electronic fuel injection in 1980 for US models, although power remained the same. This design marked a major change in direction for Porsche (started with the introduction of the 924 in 1976), whose cars had until then used only rear- or mid-mounted air-cooled flat engines with four or six cylinders.

Porsche utilised a transaxle in the 928 to help achieve 50/50 front/rear weight distribution, aiding the car's balance. Although it weighed more than the difficult-to-handle 911, its more neutral weight balance and higher power output gave it similar performance on the track. The 928 was regarded as the more relaxing car to drive at the time. It came with either a five-speed dog leg manual transmission, or a Mercedes-Benz-derived automatic transmission, originally with three speeds, with four-speed from 1983 in North America and 1984 in other markets. For the first generation cars, 1978 & 1979, the majority of cars were fitted with the less expensive 5 speed manual gearbox while the optional 3 speed automatic was much scarcer. As the model years continued, this ratio evened out and then finally more cars had the automatic transmission. The exact percentage of manual and automatic gearbox cars for the entire production run is not known.

The body, styled by Wolfgang Möbius under the guidance of Anatole Lapine, was mainly galvanized steel, but the doors, front wing, front fenders, and hood were made of aluminium to save weight. It had a substantial luggage area accessed via a large hatchback. Newly developed polyurethane elastic bumpers were integrated into the nose and tail and covered in body-coloured plastic; an unusual feature for the time that aided the car visually and reduced its drag. Another unusual feature was the pop-up headlamps which were based on the units found on the Lamborghini Miura and were integrated into the front wings.

The 928 qualified as a 2+2, having two small seats in the rear. Both rear seats could be folded down to enlarge the luggage area, and both the front and rear seats had sun visors for occupants. The rear seats are small (due to the prominent transmission hump) and have very little leg room; they are only suitable for adults on very short trips or children. The 928 was also the first vehicle in which the instrument cluster moved along with the adjustable steering wheel in order to maintain maximum instrument visibility.

The 928 included several other features such as the "Weissach Axle", a simple rear-wheel steering system that provides passive rear-wheel steering to increase stability while braking during a turn, and an unsleeved, silicon alloy engine block made of aluminium, which reduced weight and provided a highly durable cylinder bore.

Porsche's design and development efforts paid off during the 1978 European Car of the Year, where the 928 won ahead of the BMW 7 Series, and the Ford Granada. The 928 is the only sports car so far to have won this competition, where the usual winners are mainstream hatchbacks and sedans/saloons from major European manufacturers. This is regarded as proof of how advanced the 928 was, compared to its contemporaries.

Styling changes
Styling was the same in both 1978 and 1979, with the body lacking both front and rear spoilers. From 1980 (1983 in North America) through 1986, front and rear spoilers were present on "S" models, rear spoilers being integrated into the hatch. From 1987 through 1995, the front spoiler was integrated into the nose and the rear spoiler became a separated wing rather than an integrated piece, and side skirts were added. The rear tail-light configuration was also different from previous models. GTS models had wider rear fenders added to give more room for 9-inch wide wheels. Another easily noticeable visual difference between versions is the style of the wheels. Early 928s had 15-inch or 16-inch "phone dial"-style wheels, while most 1980s 928s had 16-inch slotted "flat disc" wheels, CSs, SEs and 1989 GTs had 16-inch "Club Sport" wheels, later GTs had 16-inch "Design 90" style wheels which were also option on same period S4s (shared with the 944 as well), the GTS used two variations of the 17-inch "CUP" wheels.

Later variants

Porsche introduced a refreshed 928 S into the European market in the 1980 model year, although it was the summer of 1982 and MY 1983 before the model reached North America. Externally, the S wore new front and rear spoilers and sported wider wheels and tires than the older variant, but the main change for the 928 S was under the hood, where a revised 4.7 L engine was used. From 1984 to 1986, the S model was called S2 in United Kingdom. These cars used Bosch LH-Jetronic fuel injection system and purely electronic Bosch ignition, the same systems used on the later 32-valve cars, though without the pollution controls, the high lift camshafts provided considerably more power than reported. It was not uncommon for these cars to show engine rated power on a chassis dyno. Due to low-grade fuel, the 16-valve low compression S engine was made for the Australian market in the 1985 model year. It had a 9.3:1 compression ratio pistons as opposed to the normal 10.4:1 but used the same large intake, high lift cams, large valves, etc. of other S engines.

As the faster European model was not available in the United States and Canada during the first three years of its existence, a "Competition Group" option was created to allow North American customers to have an S model lookalike with front and rear spoilers, 16-inch flat disc wheels, sport seats, sport springs and Bilstein Shock Absorbers. Customers could specify paint and interior colours the same way as on a normal 928. Two cars were made in the late 1980 model year for U.S. with this option. The package was officially available in 1981 and 1982 model years and was canceled in 1983 when the S model became available for these markets. Many cars have had S model features added by subsequent owners, making original "Competition Group" cars difficult to distinguish without checking option codes.

In the 1982 model year, two special models were available for different markets. 202 "Weissach Edition" cars were sold in North America. Unusual features were champagne gold metallic paint, matching brushed gold flat disc wheels, two-tone leather interior, a plaque containing the production number on the dash and the extremely collectible three-piece Porsche luggage set. It's believed these cars were not made with S spoilers even though these were available in U.S. during this time period as part of the "Competition Group" option. The "Weissach Edition" option was also available for the US market 911 for the 1980 model year and 924 for the 1981 model year.

141 special "50th Jubilee" 928 S models were available outside the U.S. and Canada to celebrate the company's 50-year existence as a car manufacturer. This model is also sometimes referred to as the "Ferry Porsche Edition" because his signature was embroidered into the front seats. It featured meteor metallic paint and was fitted with flat disc wheels, wine red leather and special striped fabric seat centers. Similar 911 and 924 specials were also made for world markets.

Porsche updated the North American 928 S for 1985, replacing the 4.7 L SOHC engine with a new 5.0 L DOHC unit sporting four valves per cylinder and producing . Seats were also updated to a new style, these cars are sometimes unofficially called S3 to distinguish them from 16-valve "S" models. European models kept a 4.7 L engine, which was somewhat more powerful as standard, though lower 9.3:1 compression 32-valve engine together with catalytic converters became an option in some European countries and Australia for 1986. In 1986, revised suspension settings, larger brakes with 4-piston callipers, and a modified exhaust system was available on the 928S, marking the final changes to old body style cars.  These were straight from the 928S4, which was slated to debut a few months later. These changes came starting from VIN 1001, which means that the first thousand 1986 cars had the old brakes, but later cars had this equipment available. This later 1986 model is sometimes referred to as a 1986 or 1986.5 because of these changes. The name is a little misleading as more than 3/4 of the 1986 production had these updates.

The 928 S4 variant debuted in the second half of 1986 as a 1987 model, an updated version of the 5.0 L V8 for all markets producing , sporting a new single-disc clutch in manual transmission cars, a larger torque converter in automatic transmission cars and fairly significant styling updates which gave the car a cleaner, sleeker look. S4 was much closer to being a true world car than previous models as the only major differences for North American models were instrumentation in either kilometers or miles, lighting, front and rear bumper shocks, and the availability of catalytic converters in many other markets. The Australian market version was the only one with different horsepower rating at  due to preparation for possible low grade fuel. Even this was achieved without engine changes.

A Club Sport variant which was up to  lighter became available to continental Europe and U.S. in 1988. This model was the toned down version of the 1987 factory prototype which had a lightened body. Also in 1987, the factory made five white lightweight S4 models with a manual transmission for racecar drivers who were on their payroll at the time (Derek Bell, Jochen Mass, Hans Stuck, Bob Wollek and Jacky Ickx). These were close to same as later actual Club Sport models and can also be considered prototypes for it. An SE (sometimes called the S4 Sport due to model designation on rear bumper), a sort of halfway point between a normally equipped S4 and the more race-oriented Club Sport, became available for the UK market. It's generally believed that these cars have more power than the usual S4. They utilize parts which later became known as GT pistons, cams and engine ECU programs. Some of them had stronger, short ratio manual transmission. The automatic transmission was not available for this model.

For the 1989 model year, a visible change inside was digital trip computer in the dashboard. At the same time Australian models received the same  engine management setup as other markets. Porsche debuted the 928 GT in the late winter 1988/89 after dropping the slow-selling CS and SE. In terms of equipment, the GT was like the 928 SE, having more equipment than a Club Sport model but less than a 928 S4 to keep the weight down somewhat. It had the ZF 40% limited-slip differential as standard like the Club Sport and SE before it. Also, like the CS and SE, the GT was only available with a manual gearbox. European 1989 CS and GT wheels had an RDK tire pressure monitoring system as standard, which was also optional for the same year S4. For the 1990 model year Porsche made RDK and a 0-100% variable ratio limited-slip called PSD (Porsche Sperr Differential) standard in both GT and S4 models for all markets. This system is much like the one from the flagship 959 and gives the vehicle even more grip on the track. In 1990, the S4 was no longer available with a manual transmission.

The S4 and GT variants halted production at the end of the 1991 model year, making way for the final version of the 928. The 928 GTS was available for sale in late 1991 as a 1992 model in Europe and in spring of 1992 as an early 1993 model in North America. Changed bodywork, larger front brakes and a new, more powerful 5.4 L, 350 PS (257 kW/345 hp) engine were the big advertised changes; what Porsche wasn't advertising was the price. Loaded GTS models could eclipse US$100,000 in 1995, making them among the most expensive cars on the road at the time. This severely hampered sales despite the model's high competency and long standard equipment list. Porsche discontinued the GTS model that year after shipping only 77 of them to the United States. Total worldwide production for all years was a little over 61,000 cars.

Second-hand models' value decreased as a result of high maintenance costs due to spare parts that are expensive to manufacture. Many parts suppliers and enthusiast networks exist, especially in the United States, Germany and the UK.

Road & Track magazine published a speculative piece in their April 2006 issue regarding the possibility of a new, 928-esque coupé that may debut on a shortened version of the Panamera's platform sometime around 2011 or 2012 model year but this speculation remained uncredible as Porsche denied the possibility of any such model reaching production stage.

Evolution

The evolution of the 928 during its 18 years of production was quite subtle. The tables below show the major differences, which were made to the nose, tail, interior, engine, and wheels.

1978

Model designation: 928
Engine displacement: 
Valves: 16
Fuel feed: Bosch K-Jetronic fuel injection
Max. Power (DIN):  /  (North America)
Max. Torque: 

1979

Model designation: 928
Power: 240 PS (177 kW) / 219 hp (163 kW) (North America)
Changes:
Battery box integrated as part of the body, was previously mounted to gearbox.
Gearbox shocks deleted.

1980

Model designation: 928 / 928 S (only 928 in North America)
Engine displacement: 4.5 L  / 4.7 L (S model only)
Valves: 16
Power: 240 PS (177 kW) (4.5) / 300 PS (221 kW) (4.7 S) / 229 HP (167 kW) for North America only.
Changes:
Higher 10.0:1 compression ratio engine (except North America) 4.5 L model. Same power, i.e. 240 PS (177 kW) but more torque, 380 Nm instead of 350 Nm.
Bosch L-Jetronic injection in North America.
Addition of "S" model, shown at Frankfurt in September 1979. The 928 S was not available in North America until 1983. Front & rear spoilers. Larger brakes.
Manual gearbox changed during model year requiring shorter torque tube and different rear subframe.
"S" brakes installed during model year except North America.

1981

Model designation: 928 / 928 S (928 in North America)
Engine displacement: 4.5 L  / 4.7 L (S model only)
Valves: 16
Power: 240 PS (177 kW) (4.5) / 300 PS (221 kW) (4.7 S) / 229 HP (167 kW) for North America only.
Changes:
"Competition Package" option available to US market.

1982

Model designation: 928 / 928 S (928 in North America)
Engine displacement: 4.5 L  / 4.7 L (S model only)
Valves: 16
Power: 240 PS (177 kW) (4.5) / 300 PS (221 kW) (4.7 S) / 229 HP (167 kW) for North America only.
Changes:
Vibration damper added to torque tube between 2nd and 3rd support bearing on manual gearbox cars and behind 2nd bearing on automatic gearbox cars.
Reverse gear lock added to manual gearbox.
141 "50th Jubilee" 928 S produced for worldwide markets except North America.
"S" brakes used in US models.
202 "Weissach Edition" model produced for the US market.
4.5 L model dropped from production at the end of the model year.
US "Competition Package" option dropped from production at the end of the model year.

1983

Model designation: 928 S
Weight: 1500 kg (3300 lb)
Engine displacement: 4.7 L
Power: 300 PS (221 kW) / 234 hp (174 kW) (for North America)
Changes:
North American introduction of "S" model. Standard 928 (4.5 L) model dropped.
New style hydraulic motor mounts.
Engine shocks deleted at the same time.
4-speed automatic transmission made available for North America.
Car body and torque tube changed to accommodate longer gearbox.

1984

Model designation: 928 S (928 S2 in United Kingdom)
Weight: 1500 kg (3300 lb)
Engine displacement: 4.7 L
Valves: Two per cylinder
Power: 310 PS (228 kW) / 234 hp (174 kW) for North America.
Changes:
"S" model renamed "S2" in the UK market.
Bosch LH-Jetronic injection and 4-speed automatic transmission made available for worldwide markets (previously available in North America only)
Torque tube shortened like on U.S. model in the previous year.
Bosch EZF ignition system using dual distributors makes debut. This allows higher 10.4:1 compression and increased torque.
Compression change done in the middle of model year once 10.0:1 compression ratio resulting piston stock were used up in production.
Bosch ABS brakes optional for the first time in a Porsche.
At 146 mph (235 km/h) US model top speed, Porsche boldly claims the 928S to be "the fastest street legal production car sold in the US".
Important safety related change to front suspension lower ball joints on all cars in September 1983.

1985
Model designation: 928 S / 928 S2 (UK)
Weight: 1500 kg (3300 lb)
Engine displacement: 4.7 L  (286 cubic inch)/ 5.0 litre (302 cubic inch) for North America.
Valves: Two per cylinder (four per cylinder in North America)
Power: 310 PS (306 hp, 228 kW) (worldwide) / 292 PS (288 hp, 215 kW) (for North America) / 275 PS (272 hp, 202 kW) (4.7 L) for (Australia)
Changes:
New 5.0-litre 288 hp 32-valve engine equipped with Bosch LH-Jetronic injection and Bosch EZF ignition made available for the US market.
Top speed (for the US model) is now in excess of 250 km/h (155 mph).
Special two-valve 4.7 L engine (9.3:1 c/r) option M151 for Australia. Compression change was done with different shape piston tops. Coupled only with automatic transmission. Engine number is same M28/22 as the high-compression 2-valve engines.
LH-Jetronic control box design changed in international markets.
New style front seats. Redesigned more modern looking door panels installed when multi speaker stereo was ordered.
Gearbox synchromesh changed to BorgWarner design and shorter gear lever, improving driveability on manual transmission cars.
Shims left out from front end of torque tube drive plate in automatic transmission cars, this sometimes cause engine thrust bearing failures.
Radio antenna moved to embedded windshield wire.

1986
Model designation: 928 S / 928 S2 (UK)
Engine displacement: 4.7 L (286 cubic inches) / 5.0 L (302 cubic inches) (North America, optional elsewhere)
Valves: Two per cylinder (four for North America, optional elsewhere)
Power: 310 PS (306 hp, 228 kW) (worldwide) / 292 PS (288 hp, 215 kW) (for North America) / 288 PS (284 hp, 212 kW) (for Australia, optional for Germany, Austria, Japan)
Changes:
Lowered 9.3:1 compression ratio four-valve engine optional for some markets along with catalytic converter, standard in Australia. Compression change was done with different shape piston tops.
"S4" suspension package and Brembo brakes for 1986 models (from VIN 1001  and November 1985 onwards in North America). No U.S. models made with VIN ending between 0938 and 1000 due to parts change.
ABS brakes became standard for all markets during model year production.

1987
Model designation: 928 S4
Weight: 1590 kg (3500 lb)
Engine displacement: 5.0 L
Valves: Four per cylinder
Power: 320 PS (316 hp, 236 kW) / 300 PS (296 hp, 221 kW) for Australia.
Changes:
Different style pistons, cylinder heads, camshafts, intake and larger intake valves compared to earlier 5.0 L engines.
Nominal static compression ratio 10.0:1 (True ratio between 9.4:1 and 10.0:1, depending on parts used).
Cylinder head studs used in all earlier engines replaced with bolts making it easier to remove heads while engine is in engine bay.
Updated LH-Jetronic injection and ignition changed to EZK system, two knock sensors added to engine. Single disk clutch on manual transmission cars, larger torque converter on automatics.
Modified front brake calipers used with 2 mm diameter increase for larger pistons. Cars sold to U.S., Canada, Australia and Arab countries got new parts once remaining old design calliper stock was used up.
New style front & rear bumpers and rear wing spoiler.
Older style S wing still available as option M471. This is the same option number as 1980-82 Competition Group. Porsche has used same numbers several times in different model years and models. In different years they can mean different things.
Redesigned front and rear bumper light assemblies.
Body changed compared to earlier models to accommodate larger rear lamps, rear seat area modified to give room for new torque converter.
Upwards folding rear spoiler and piston oil squirters in engine block on early cars only.
Different horsepower rating for Australia due to different ignition map used because of possible low grade fuel.

1988
Model designation: 928 S4 / 928 CS / 928 SE (UK)
Engine displacement: 5.0 L
Valves: Four per cylinder
Power: 320 PS (316 hp, 236 kW) (S4, CS and SE) / 300 PS (296 hp, 221 kW) (S4) for Australia
Changes:
Lighter 928 CS "Club Sport" version available in Continental Europe and USA, 928 SE (S4 Sport) in UK.
Only model year for "CS" (USA) and "SE" (UK). "CS" uses different VIN sequence than normal "S4".
Stronger torque tube with 3 mm thicker center shaft for automatic transmission.
Pistons with strengthened skirt installed in February 1988.
Oil drainage improved in piston skirts.

1989
Model designation: 928 S4 / 928 CS / 928 GT ("CS" model discontinued in USA)
Engine displacement: 5.0 L
Valves: Four per cylinder
Power: 320 PS (316 hp, 235 kW) (S4 and CS) / 330 PS (326 hp, 243 kW) (GT)
Changes:
February 1989, manual transmission-only "928 GT" debuts as a better-equipped version (all markets).
Digital trip computer/warning system added to dashboard, ignition circuit monitor system added.
For Australian cars same ignition maps resulting the same horsepower rating as in other markets.
North America manual transmission model now uses same shorter final drive ratio as used elsewhere, to simplify production.
RDK tire pressure monitoring system optional on S4, standard on CS and GT.
Thicker cylinder head casting taken into use early in model year to strengthen head against cracking. Longer head bolts needed because of the change.
Modified front brake calipers with improved seals taken into use early in model year.
928 CS now had the same VIN sequence as 928 S4. Model dropped from production during the model year at the end of 1988.

1990
Model designation: 928 S4 / 928 GT
Engine displacement: 5.0 L
Valves: Four per cylinder
Power: 320 PS (316 hp, 235 kW) (S4) / 330 PS (326 hp, 243 kW) (GT)
Changes:
GT pistons into use in S4 also resulting true 10.0:1 compression ratio for all engines.
RDK tire pressure monitoring system standard on all cars. Computer controlled 0-100% PSD locking differential added to both models.
S4 no longer available with manual gearbox.
Dual airbags now standard across all Porsche models in U.S. Driver's and front passenger airbag optional elsewhere, only driver's side bag available in RHD markets.

1991
Model designation: 928 S4 / 928 GT
Engine displacement: 5.0 L
Valves: Four per cylinder
Power: 320 PS (316 hp, 235 kW) (S4) / 330 PS (326 hp, 243 kW) (GT)
Changes:
Improvements to cooling in exhaust side at cylinder heads, steering rack, power steering pump, soundproofing, front cooling flaps deleted, new style shift knob with integrated leather booth in manual gearbox cars, etc.
Temperature sensors for ignition circuit monitor system moved from #4 and #8 cylinders to #3 and #7 cylinders to improve their efficiency.
Check engine warning light added to all US models due to California regulatory demands.
Two airbags as standard in LHD models during model year production for most markets.

1992
Model designation: 928 GTS
Engine displacement: 5.4 L
Valves: Four per cylinder
Power: 350 PS (345 hp, 257 kW)
Changes:
Engine displacement increases to 5.4 L due to increased crankshaft stroke. Piston compression height adjusted to matched new stroke.
10.4:1 compression ratio pistons
Milder camshafts for emission purposes
Bodywork updated with flared rear fenders and so-called "cup" style wing mirrors.
"Big Black" front brakes, significantly larger than the "S4" version.
Stronger manual gearbox with differential driven oil pump and front-mounted oil cooler.
GTS became available in North America at January 1992 as early 1993 model with later model year VIN. These cars use the same parts as 1992 models and can be differentiated from true 1993 US models with separate VIN sequences and option code M718.

1993
Model designation: 928 GTS
Engine displacement: 5.4 L
Valves: Four per cylinder
Power: 350 PS (345 hp, 257 kW)
Changes:
Cylinder block lower half studs replaced with bolts.
Engine piston rings changed to limit oil consumption and pistons changed to strengthen skirt area.
Minor update to gearbox clutch.
Air conditioner refrigerant changed to R-134a.
 Driver-side airbag standard in RHD cars, passenger-side airbag not available in them.

1994
Model designation: 928 GTS
Engine displacement: 5.4 L
Valves: Four per cylinder
Power: 350 PS (345 hp, 257 kW)
Changes:
Cabin pollen filter added.
Dynamic kickdown for automatic transmission models.
Wheel design changed to "Cup II", RDK deleted at same time.
First 19 US models were made already in spring of 1993, months before when normal model year change occurs in July/August. These M718 option cars still used previous model year parts like Cup I wheels and do not have 1994 model year updates despite using the same 1994 VIN sequence.
Connecting rods changed to stronger design part in middle of model year.

1995
Model designation: 928 GTS
Engine displacement: 5.4 L
Valves: Four per cylinder
Power: 350 PS (345 hp, 257 kW)
Torque: 500 N·m (369 lb·ft)
Changes:
Special model available in some markets containing 8" wide front wheels.
Special colours (only available with automatic gearbox): "Iris blue" metallic and "Amazon green" metallic colour with Classic grey leather interior.

Timeline

Worldwide production numbers
All production numbers are approximate figures collected from several sources. Porsche hasn't published actual numbers.

1) Count contains 2 1980, 458 1981 and 1,084 1982 US "Competition Group" models made.
2) Count contains 202 US "Weissach edition" models made in 1982 model year. 205 is official number which don't seem to be correct. Cars with higher production number than 202 or 205 exist. 217 is known existing plaque number but there were only 202 cars made with M462 option code.
3) Count contains 141 European "50th Jubilee" models made in 1982 model year.
4) Count contains 44 M151 low compression 16V 4.7L S engine models made in 1985 model year for Australian market.
5) Count contains 2,219 so-called S3 US models made in 1985 model year and 877 1986 models made in early part of 1986 model year up to November 1985.
6) Count contains 517 1986 European 32-valve S models. Most were Australian and Japanese models. 266 were optional M298/M299 catalytic converter models sold in Germany, Switzerland and Austria.
7) Count contains 2,071 so-called S3.5 US models made in later part of 1986 model year starting from November 1985.
8) Count contains 6 Club Sport prototypes made in the 1987 model year.
9) Count contains 10 European models and 2 US models made in 1988 model year and 7 European models made in early part of 1989 model year. Last Club Sport cars were made in early winter 1988/89.
10) Count contains 358 European and 115 US/CDN model made in 1989 model year, 808 European and 142 US made in 1990, 516 European and 145 US made in 1991 resulting 1682 European and 396 US model made over two and half year time period. GT production started in around February 1989. 
11) Count contains 955 1992, 621 1993, 523 1994 and 399 1995 European models resulting 2,498 cars made. Count contains 88 early VIN 1993, 102 late VIN 1993, 19 + 120 1994 and 77 1995 US models resulting 406 cars made.

Special versions

Porsche 942
The Porsche 942 was a special edition 928 presented by the company as a gift to Ferry Porsche on his 75th birthday in 1984. It's also known as the 928–4. It featured a  longer wheelbase than the normal 928 production model, including an extended roof above the rear seats to better accommodate tall passengers, and what were at the time very advanced projector headlights. It also received the new front and rear bumpers two years before they entered production on the S4 and the 5.0-litre 32-valve engine before it was introduced in the US market.

"Study H50" Four-door 928 based prototype

Three years later, in 1987, the lengthened 928 that had been presented to the company's founder on his 75th birthday turned up as a "Feasibility Study", now with a second (rather narrow) set of doors, apparently opening in the same way as the suicide doors seen on the later Mazda RX-8.  At the time "Study H50" appeared to sink with little trace, but two decades later, with the launch of the larger four-door Porsche Panamera saloon, the 928 based four-door saloon prototype from 1987 acquired greater significance.

928 long wheelbase specials
In 1986 Porsche together with tuning company AMG made a few long-wheelbase 928 specials. Unlike the 942, these had normal 928 headlights. One was presented to American Sunroof Corporation (ASC) founder and CEO Heinz Prechter. ASC was later partly responsible for manufacturing Porsche 944 S2 cabriolets.

Racing

The Max Moritz 'Semi Works' 928 GTR
Porsche's Racing Department never officially entered or prepared a racing 928 for a pure works entry. Only once Porsche decided to make it obvious to the 911 enthusiasts that they usually tended to underrate the racing genes of the 928. Porsche then "arranged" this 928GTR to compete against the then-dominant 911 (993GTR) on the race track. In order not to offend sensibilities of their traditional 911 customers by openly challenging them with a Works 928GTR offering, Porsche asked Max Moritz Racing, their longtime private racing partner from nearby Reutlingen to enter a 928GTR Cup as a 'semi-works' car.

The drivers were: Bernd Mayländer, Manuel Reuter (Porsche works pilots), also Harm Lagaay (then Head of Porsche's Design Studio). Vittorio Strosek sponsored MM with his Lightweight-Body-Parts and racing exhaust. The car was officially entered by Porsche-Club-Schwaben.

Lagaay reports that the car was very competitive and able to hold most 964 Cup GTs down, although the engine was no more than fine-tuned after having been chosen from a set of high power output specimen in Weissach. In the last race of the season at Hockenheim a crank-bearing ran dry. As the car was supposed to race in 1995 as well, it was made ready to continue its successful competition in the 1995 season. A fresh engine was installed, selected from the same lot of high output engines and tuned as before. In 1995 Porsche's 928 production came to an end, and the car consequently was not raced in the new season.

The late Max Moritz himself then added the car to his collection of historic vehicles. It was not put on the road again until after his death, when the family sold the car in October 2004 - with 24,500 km on the odometer.

All-aluminium 928
For the 1984 24 hours of Daytona, Porsche sent one of its experimental "All-aluminium" 928S to the Brumos Racing Team to be prepared with specific instruction not to modify the car in any way. Porsche wanted to promote the performance of the 928 to North America. The drivers Richard Attwood (GB), Vic Elford (GB), Howard Meister (USA) and Bob Hagestad (USA) were told to just "drive the car". During practice for the 24-hour race the drivers found the car to be somewhat unstable on the high banks of Daytona and wanted to add a rear wing to the car; Porsche denied the request. The Brumos team tinkered with the suspension set up to make the car more stable. The car finished in 15th overall and 4th in the GTO class. One driver stated in an interview later on, that were it not for a lengthy pit stop to fix some body damage, they would have finished in the top 5 overall. The car was then returned to Porsche and is now in the Porsche Museum.

A 928S from Raymond Boutinaud also competed at the 24 Hours of Le Mans in 1983 & 1984 with a 22nd-place finish in 1984. The same car also competed in 1000k races at Spa, Brands Hatch and Silverstone in 1984, but with little success. It has been rumored that the Raymond Boutinaud 928S was also an "all-aluminium" car from Porsche but that has been unfounded.

Bonneville
On August 7, 1986, American racing driver Al Holbert set a speed record at Bonneville in a pre-production 928 S4. This 928 would turn 171.110 mph in the flying mile and 171.926 mph for the flying kilometer. In March 1986, the same car reportedly did 180+ mph at Nardo, but the Bonneville run netted the United States Auto Club official record at the time for International Category A, Group 2, Class 9, for normally aspirated vehicles. That made 1987's 928 S4 the fastest non-turbocharged production car in the world.

On September 15, 2011, at the Bonneville Salt Flats, American race car builder and driver Carl Fausett set a new Bonneville record of 216.63537 MPH, certified by the Utah Salt Flats Racing Association. USFRA. The car was a 900 BHP supercharged 6.5 Liter 928 specially built by Fausett and his team for the Bonneville attempt. The car was dubbed the “Rekordwagen” and raced in class Blown Gas Modified Sports B/BGMS. This was a new world record for the 928 model at that time, although Fausett would go on to eclipse this record again later (see Closed Course Speed Record below).

Pikes Peak
The Pikes Peak International Hill Climb is the second oldest auto race in the U.S.; a 12.42 mile (19.99 km) course with 156 turns starting at 9390 ft and ending at the 14110 foot summit of Pikes Peak. In 2007, 2008 and 2009 American racing driver Carl Fausett took his specially prepared and supercharged 1978 Porsche 928 to the Pikes Peak International Hill Climb and competed in the Open Division. Fausett placed third in the Open Division in both 2007 and again in 2009, where he was also the fastest 2WD car. At that time, much of the racecourse was gravel. Today the entire Pikes Peak Highway has been paved.

Closed Course Speed Record
A new closed course speed record was set for the Porsche 928 at the Transportation Research Center (TRC) Proving Grounds. TRC. in Ohio on October 5, 2020. Race car builder and driver Carl Fausett reached 234.434 MPH on the high-banked paved oval. The vehicle was the same car he took to Bonneville (above) with further enhancements. At the time of this race, it had 1134 BHP from a specially constructed and supercharged Porsche 928 V8 and had been named The Meg in reference to the Megalodon. Speeds were measured by Tag/Heuer laser traps and certified by TRC staff. The 234.434 MPH top speed eclipsed the previous record of 216.635 MPH and made the Meg the worlds' fastest 928, and set a new Porsche closed-course record. Excellence Magazine.

References

Notes

Bibliography

General

 
 
 Bowler, M & Wood, J (1997). The Fastest Cars From Around the World. Parragon. ISBN.
 
 
 
 
 
 
 
 
 
 
 
 Hogsten, Dag E. "Jättetest Alla modeller Porsche". Teknikens Värld issue #13, June 17, 1981. 
 
 
 
 
 
 
 
 
 
 
 
 
 
 Porsche Scene - Germany (12/2006) "Frisch aufgelegt: Stroseks Design Klassiker" 
 911&PORSCHE WORLD - GB (May/June 1994)  "928 Cup Racer"

Workshop manuals

External links

 Porsche Classic Road Vehicles

928
1980s cars
1990s cars
Grand tourers
Coupés
Hatchbacks
Rear-wheel-drive vehicles
Cars introduced in 1977